"Better Love Next Time" is a song by Dr. Hook, released as a single in the fall of 1979. It was the first of three singles from their LP Sometimes You Win.

Background
The lyrics involve the singer comforting and encouraging a grieving and despondent friend who has lost a love, with the reassurance that "better love" will be found in the future.

In the United States, the single reached No. 12 on the Billboard Hot 100 and spent 19 weeks on the chart.  It also reached No. 3 on the Adult Contemporary chart.  It was less of a hit in Canada, but reached the Top 10 in the United Kingdom (#8) and New Zealand (#7).  "Better Love Next Time" is ranked as the 49th biggest American hit of 1980.

Chart performance

Weekly singles charts

Year-end charts

References

External links
 

1979 songs
1979 singles
Dr. Hook & the Medicine Show songs
Song recordings produced by Ron Haffkine
Capitol Records singles
Pop ballads
1970s ballads
Torch songs